Rika Hiraki and Naoko Kijimuta were the defending champions but they competed with different partners that year, Hiraki with Alexia Dechaume-Balleret and Kijimuta with Nana Miyagi.

Hiraki and Dechaume-Balleret lost in the first round to Lenka Němečková and Yuka Yoshida.

Kijimuta and Miyagi lost in the semifinals to Kerry-Anne Guse and Kristine Radford.

Guse and Radford won in the final 6–4, 5–7, 7–5 against Nemeckova and Yoshida.

Seeds
Champion seeds are indicated in bold text while text in italics indicates the round in which those seeds were eliminated.

 Naoko Kijimuta /  Nana Miyagi (semifinals)
 Alexia Dechaume-Balleret /  Rika Hiraki (first round)
 Sung-Hee Park /  Shi-Ting Wang (first round)
 Kerry-Anne Guse /  Kristine Radford (champions)

Draw

External links
 1997 Danamon Open Doubles draw

Danamon Open
1997 WTA Tour